Wouter Koolmees (born 20 March 1977) is a Dutch economist and politician and of the Democrats 66 (D66) party who has been serving as Minister of Social Affairs and Employment in the Third Rutte cabinet since 2017. He also served as second Deputy Prime Minister of the Netherlands from 2019 to 2020 during Kajsa Ollongren's medical leave of absence.

Early life and education
Koolmees studied economics at Utrecht University.

Career in the civil service
Before entering politics, he worked for several employers, including as a civil servant at the Ministry of Finance.

Career in national politics
Koolmees was a member of the House of Representatives from 17 June 2010 until his ministerial appointment on 26 October 2017; as a parliamentarian, he focused on matters of finance, transport and water supply.

Following the 2017 general election, Koolmees represented his party's interests alongside then-party leader Alexander Pechtold at the negotiating table with the People's Party for Freedom and Democracy (VVD) to form Mark Rutte's third cabinet. On 26 October 2017, he assumed office as Minister of Social Affairs and Employment, succeeding Lodewijk Asscher.

Following the 2021 national elections, Koolmees and Tamara van Ark of the VVD were chosen to lead their parties' negotiations on a coalition agreement.

References

External links

Official
  Drs. W. (Wouter) Koolmees Parlement & Politiek

1977 births
Living people
Democrats 66 politicians
Deputy Prime Ministers of the Netherlands
Dutch accountants
Dutch financial analysts
Members of the House of Representatives (Netherlands)
Ministers of Social Affairs of the Netherlands
People from Capelle aan den IJssel
Politicians from Rotterdam
Utrecht University alumni
21st-century Dutch civil servants
21st-century Dutch economists
21st-century Dutch politicians